Atula Abeysekera, FCGI is a British Engineer, a Professor and an expert in Enterprise Risk Management in Financial Services.

Early life 
Abeysekera was born in London, England and spent his early childhood in Sri Lanka, before returning to the United Kingdom. He graduated in civil engineering from Imperial College, London in 1981.

Career 
After graduating, Abeysekera then spent four years working as a civil engineer before deciding to pursue a career in Financial Services. He then went on to work for various Financial institutions such as KPMG, Morgan Stanley, Fidelity & Lazard. He is currently a Senior Risk Officer at Schroders.

He was appointed by the Secretary State of Housing, Communities and Local Government to drive forward the building safety programme following the Grenfell tragedy. He remains a member of the Industry Safety Steering Group (ISSG).

Abeysekera is also a member of The Worshipful Company of International Bankers.

Notable Publications & Work 
Abeysekera's publications have been republished by professional publications and a think tank. He is the author of the policy paper 'Black Swans means business', 'Resuscitating the NHS'  and 'Mind the Gap – Funding for UK’s Flood Defences: The Bow Group'.

He is the author of the book 'What’s the small idea? - Innovation and Risk Culture in Government'.

Abeysekera is frequently a speaker on Black Swans in Risk management.

Awards 
In 2017, Abeysekera was awarded Fellowship by the City and Guilds of London Institute.

He is also a recipient of The Freedom of the City of London.

References 

Academics of Imperial College London
Academics from London
British civil engineers
British bankers
Year of birth missing (living people)
Living people